Lake Kopa is a lake in the city of Kokshetau, located on the territory of Akmola Region close to the foot of Kokshetau Elevation in the northern part of Kazakhstan. It is 5.6 km long and 12 km wide. The total surface area of it the lake is about  depending on water level. It is fed by 2 rivers and is drained by the Shagalaly. The area of Lake Kopa fluctuates year to year, but in recent years the size of the lake has been decreasing overall. Kopa is used for fishery.

Location and description 

Lake Kopa is located in the north of Kazakhstan. Only a very small part, comes from the lake itself.

The south and west sides of the lake are separated from the adjacent beaches by depressed areas, and along the southern and eastern coasts are sand and pebble beaches. The northern and eastern shores of the lake are low, flat, and overgrown with vegetation, meaning that the water surface of the lake is basically open only along the western and northern stretches.

50-70 m-high hills (Bukpa Hill) come close to the lake from south-west.

Shagalaly flows into the lake from south-west and flows out from the north part, therefore, Lake Kopa regulates flow of Shagalaly river in its lower stream. Administratively, the lake and the adjacent land are within Akmola Region of Kazakhstan.

See also
Kokshetau – the city at Lake Kopa

References

External links 
 

Kopa
Geography of Akmola Region